Thomas Theodore Jefferson (born June 8, 1962) is an American former sprinter. He won a bronze medal in the 200 m at the 1984 Summer Olympics. Jefferson also won a bronze medal in the 4×100 m relay at the 1984 Universiade and placed fourth in the 200 m at the 1991 World Indoors Championships. He was ranked #3 in the world over 200 m in 1984.

May 1985, Won Mid-american Conference (MAC) Championship in the 100 and 200 meter dash.

Selected to Kent State University Hall of Fame in 1992.

References

External links
 

1962 births
Living people
American male sprinters
Olympic bronze medalists for the United States in track and field
Athletes (track and field) at the 1984 Summer Olympics
Track and field athletes from Cleveland
Kent State Golden Flashes men's track and field athletes
Medalists at the 1984 Summer Olympics
Universiade medalists in athletics (track and field)
Universiade bronze medalists for the United States